Jessica Blaszka (born 5 August 1992 in Heerlen) is a retired Dutch wrestler who wrestled mainly in the 48 kg  weight class. She is a bronze medalist at the World Wrestling Championships and a two-time medalist at the European Wrestling Championships.

Career 

In the youth category she became European Champion in 2007 (43 kg), 2008 (46 kg) and 2009 (46 kg) and won the silver medal as a junior in 2010 (48 kg). She represented the Netherlands at the 2015 European Games in Baku, Azerbaijan, where she lost in the quarter finals and finished in 9th position. She won the bronze medal in the women's freestyle 48 kg at the 2015 World Wrestling Championships in Las Vegas, United States. It was the first medal for the Netherlands at a senior international wrestling championship (World, European) after 28 years. With this third place she met the Dutch qualification standard to compete at the 2016 Summer Olympics.

In March 2021, she competed at the European Qualification Tournament in Budapest, Hungary hoping to qualify for the 2020 Summer Olympics in Tokyo, Japan. She failed to qualify at this tournament and she also failed to qualify for the Olympics at the World Olympic Qualification Tournament held in Sofia, Bulgaria. A few days after her result at the World Olympic Qualification Tournament, she decided to end her wrestling career.

Personal
As of 2015 she lives together with her parents and sister Virginia and dog Emo in Landgraaf. She went to the Herle-College and Arcus-College.

Results

Senior results
European Games
9th 2015 European Games

World Championships
 16th 2010 World Wrestling Championships
 12th 2011 World Wrestling Championships
 9th 2014 World Wrestling Championships
  2015 World Wrestling Championships

European Championships
 10th 2010 European Wrestling Championships (48 kg)
 12th 2011 European Wrestling Championships (48 kg)
 7th 2012 European Wrestling Championships (51 kg)

Because she was injured she did not participate at the 2012 World Wrestling Championships, 2013 World Wrestling Championships, 2013 European Wrestling Championships and 2014 European Wrestling Championships.

References

External links
 official website

Dutch female sport wrestlers
Living people
1992 births
Sportspeople from Heerlen
Wrestlers at the 2015 European Games
European Games competitors for the Netherlands
World Wrestling Championships medalists
Wrestlers at the 2016 Summer Olympics
Olympic wrestlers of the Netherlands
Wrestlers at the 2019 European Games
European Wrestling Championships medalists
20th-century Dutch women
20th-century Dutch people
21st-century Dutch women